The Mamprusi language is a Gur language spoken in northern Ghana, Northern Togo, Burkina Faso, Ivory Coast and Mali by the Mamprusi people. It is partially mutually intelligible with Dagbani. The Mamprusi language is spoken in a broad belt across the northern parts of the Northern Region of Ghana, stretching west to east from Yizeesi to Nakpanduri and centred on the towns of Gambaga, Nalerigu and Walewale.

The language belongs to the Gur family which is part of the Niger–Congo language family, which covers most of Sub-Saharan Africa (Bendor-Samuel 1989). Within Gur it belongs to the Western Oti–Volta subgroup, and particularly its southeastern cluster of six to eight languages (Naden 1988, 1989). Closely related and very similar languages spoken nearby are Dagbani, Nanun, Kamara and Hanga in the Northern Region, and Kusaal, Nabit and Talni in the Upper East Region. Not quite so closely related are Farefare, Waali, Dagaari, Birifor and Safalaba in the Upper East and Upper West Regions and southwest of the Northern Region.

Comparatively little linguistic material on the language has been published; there is a brief sketch as an illustration of this subgroup of languages in Naden 1988. A collection of Mampruli proverbs has been published by R.P. Xavier Plissart, and a translation of the New Testament is in print, a sample of which can be read and heard online. There are also beginning Mampruli lessons in which the spoken language can be heard.

Names 
The general and accepted name for the language is Mampruli. The name Mamprusi Is mostly used to refer to the ethnic group who speak the language, and it is not accepted by native speakers to refer to the language.

Other countries 
Mampruli is also spoken at the border in the Savanes Region of Togo, across the Ghanaian border. It is also spoken by some emigrated communities in parts of Burkina Faso, Ivory Coast, and Mali.

Dialects
There is comparatively little dialect variation. The western (Walewale to the White Volta) and Far Western (west of the White Volta, area have some variant pronunciation standards. The far Eastern dialect (Durili) is most notable for pronouncing [r] and [l] where the rest of Mampruli pronounces [l] and [r] respectively, and for some characteristic intonation patterns.

Phonology

Vowels
Mampruli has ten phonemic vowels: five short and five long vowels:

Consonants

Writing system
Mampruli is written in a Latin alphabet, but the literacy rate is fairly low.  The orthography currently used represents a number of allophonic distinctions. There is a description of the process of formulating the orthography.

Alphabet

Grammar
Mampruli has a fairly conservative Oti-Volta grammatical system. The constituent order in Mampruli sentences is usually agent–verb–object. There is a simple, non-technical grammatical study <<to be expanded>>

Lexicon
The rather unusual trilingual (Mampruli-Spanish-English) dictionary was superseded by the more-reliable simple glossary: a full-featured Mampruli dictionary is in course of preparation. A hundred-word sample can be seen on the Kamusi project site

References

Languages of Ghana
Oti–Volta languages
Mamprusi people